Barry Griffiths (born 12 July 1929) is a former Australian rules footballer who played for the Hawthorn Football Club in the Victorian Football League (VFL).

Notes

External links 

Possibly living people
1929 births
Australian rules footballers from Victoria (Australia)
Hawthorn Football Club players